USS Newport (PF-27), a  in commission from 1944 to 1945, and from 1950 to 1952, was the second ship of the United States Navy to be named for the city of Newport, Rhode Island. She later served in the Soviet Navy as EK-28 and in the Japan Maritime Self-Defense Force as JDS Kaede (PF-13), JDS Kaede (PF-293) and as YAC-17.

Construction and commissioning
Originally classified as a patrol gunboat, PG-135, Newport was reclassified as a patrol frigate, PF-46, on 15 April 1943. She was laid down by the Walter Butler Shipbuilding Company in Superior, Wisconsin, on 8 June 1943, and launched on 15 August 1943, sponsored by Mrs. Nicholas Brown. She was commissioned at New Orleans, Louisiana, on 8 September 1944.

Service history

U.S. Navy, World War II, 1944-1945
After shakedown at Bermuda, Newport proceeded from New York, New York, to Guantanamo Bay Naval Base, Cuba, on escort duty, returning on 24 February 1945 to Tompkinsville on Staten Island, New York, her home port for exercises and patrol off the United States East Coast until 9 July 1945.

Earmarked for transfer to the Soviet Navy in Project Hula, a secret program for the transfer of U.S. Navy ships to the Soviet Navy in anticipation of the Soviet Union joining the war against Japan, Newport steamed via the Panama Canal and Seattle, Washington, to Cold Bay in the Territory of Alaska to train her new Soviet crew.

Soviet Navy, 1945–1949

Commissioned into the Soviet Navy immediately, Newport was designated as a storozhevoi korabl ("escort ship") and renamed EK-28 in Soviet service.

On 5 September 1945, all ship transfers to the Soviet Union were ordered stopped, although training for ships already transferred was allowed to continue.  Accordingly, EK-28 remained at Cold Bay along with EK-26 (ex-Gloucester), EK-29 (ex-Bath), and EK-30 (ex-Evanvsille) for additional shakedown and training until 17 September 1945, when all four ships departed in company bound for Petropavlovsk-Kamchatsky in the Soviet Union, the last four of the 149 Project Hula ships to do so. Too late for World War II service with the Soviet Navy, EK-28 served as a patrol vessel in the Soviet Far East.

In February 1946, the United States began negotiations for the return of ships loaned to the Soviet Union for use during World War II. On 8 May 1947, United States Secretary of the Navy James V. Forrestal informed the United States Department of State that the United States Department of the Navy wanted 480 of the 585 combatant ships it had transferred to the Soviet Union for World War II use returned, EK-28 among them. Negotiations for the return of the ships were protracted, but on 14 November 1949 the Soviet Union finally returned EK-28 to the U.S. Navy at Yokosuka, Japan.

U.S. Navy, Korean War, 1950–1953
Reverting to her original name, Newport lay idle in the Pacific Reserve Fleet until recommissioned on 27 July 1950 for service in the Korean War. Lieutenant Commander P.A. Lilly became her recommissioning Commanding Officer. She patrolled off Inchon, Korea, from 15 to 26 September 1950, screening United Nations ships during the Inchon landings. Lilly recalled, "The extreme tides made for extreme currents and rip tides. When I went alongside an anchored tanker, I had to keep engines turning to stay alongside until fully moored. After the troops were safely ashore, we (escort ships) made our way back to Japan with the newly empty troop ships."

Newport then was converted for service as a weather ship, and so served on ocean weather stations in the Northwest Pacific Ocean until November 1951, when she took up varied duties off Korea, including screening underway replenishment groups, patrolling, and on 29 December 1951 conducting a shore bombardment at Wonsan.  She next operated in the Philippine Islands until decommissioning at Yokosuka on 30 April 1952 and returning to a reserve status.

Japan Maritime Self-Defense Force, 1953–1975

The JMSDF reclassified her as PF-293 on 1 September 1957. The U.S. Navy struck her from the U.S. Naval Vessel Register on 1 December 1961, and the United States transferred her to the JMSDF outright on 28 August 1962. Kaede was reclassified as an "auxiliary stock craft" (YAC) and renamed YAC-17 on 31 March 1966, serving thereafter as a non-operational training ship. Decommissioned on 31 March 1972, YAC-17 was returned to U.S. custody on 20 May 1975. Her final disposition is unknown.

Awards

American Campaign Medal
Asiatic-Pacific Campaign Medal
World War II Victory Medal
China Service Medal
National Defense Service Medal
Korean Service Medal with four battle stars
United Nations Service Medal

References

External links 

hazegray.org: USS Newport
 

 

Tacoma-class frigates
Ships built in Superior, Wisconsin
1943 ships
World War II frigates and destroyer escorts of the United States
Tacoma-class frigates of the Soviet Navy
World War II frigates of the Soviet Union
Cold War frigates of the Soviet Union
Cold War frigates and destroyer escorts of the United States
Korean War frigates and destroyer escorts of the United States
Tacoma-class frigates of the Japan Maritime Self-Defense Force
Ships transferred under Project Hula